Womyn-born womyn (WBW) is a term developed during second-wave feminism to designate women who were assigned female at birth, were raised as girls, and identify as women (or womyn, a deliberately alternative spelling that challenges the centering of male as norm). The policy is noted for exclusion of trans women. Third-wave feminism and fourth-wave feminism have generally done away with the idea of WBW.

Events and organizations that have womyn-born-womyn-only policies bar access to anyone who was assigned male at birth: cis men, trans women, and male children older than a determined age.

Second-wave feminism
The term "womyn-born womyn" gained usage and popularity during the second wave feminist movement. In 1978, the Lesbian Organization of Toronto adopted a womyn-born womyn-only policy in response to a request for admittance by a transgender woman who identified as lesbian. Womyn-born womyn policies held that the nature of the feminine experience over the course of a lifetime could only be experienced by someone who experienced life presenting as a woman. The intent was to create a space for only women, defined not by identity but experience, defined in a way that excluded transgender women.

Key anti-trans proponents in the second wave feminist movement included Janice Raymond, Robin Morgan, Germaine Greer, Andrea Dworkin, and Mary Daly, who were proponents of womyn-born womyn policies. These policies created controversy and scholarly discussion.

Raymond's The Transsexual Empire (1979) is often seen as the characterizing work of this movement; Julia Serano criticizes it as an "anti-trans screed". It is known for its view of trans women as privileged men who did not previously live in the oppression of the patriarchy, stating, "We know who we are. We know that we are women who are born with female chromosomes and anatomy, and that whether or not we were socialised to be so-called normal women, patriarchy has treated and will treat us like women. Transsexuals have not had this same history."

Sheila Jeffreys was similarly outspoken in her criticisms of trans women, arguing that the feminine characteristics they were adopting are simply those that women must adopt to avoid punishment from the patriarchy. She believed trans women adopt stereotypical attributes that are enforced by the patriarchy and were political signifiers of the oppression of women. (See social construction of gender.)

Judith Butler (regarded as the "most significant theorist" of third-wave feminism) is opposed to womyn-born-womyn policies, yet is often used as an argument for them by modern second-wave feminists. Butler's 1990 book Gender Trouble: Feminism and the Subversion of Identity contained discussion of performativity versus performance, which second-wave feminists used to exclude trans women on account of their performativity through repetition of gender norms, which is "real only to the extent that it is performed", which was used as a separator from experience.

Third and fourth wave perspectives 
Julia Serano, writing in 2007, sharply criticized WBW as transmisogyny. She points to a double standard: trans men were allowed in WBW spaces, but trans women were not. In effect, this meant that trans men were treated as if they were women. Serano criticizes the WBW idea as inherently sexist against women, which goes against the very idea of feminism. Preventing pre-op trans women, she says, is phallocentric and objectifies trans women, and countered that butches are well tolerated in the feminist community despite their mannishness. If women can transcend their socialization, she argues so too can women assigned male at birth, adding that the idea that trans women, having been socialized as men, have some unique "male energy" is really just making the case that men have abilities women do not, which is anti-feminist.

Author Nadia Khayrallah finds the WBW idea at odds with itself. She wonders how one can choose to be labelled a "womyn", but then claim biological determinism by stating one is born a "womyn".

Women-only spaces
A women-only space is an area where only women are allowed, thus providing a place where they do not have to interact with men. Historically and globally, many cultures had, and many still have, some form of female seclusion. Organizations and events with womyn-born womyn policies specifically exclude trans women from these spaces, restricting access to only cisgender women.

Michigan Womyn's Music Festival
Throughout the final quarter of the twentieth century, women's music festivals often enacted womyn-born womyn policies. After the Michigan Womyn's Music Festival (MichFest) was described as a gathering for "women born as women and living as women", these intentions garnered wider attention in response to the exclusion of trans women from such events.

In 1977, MichFest's primary owner, Lisa Vogel, issued a letter (co-signed by 21 supporters) to the feminist music collective Olivia Records, objecting to the inclusion of production employees at the festival that were not born female, notably Sandy Stone:

After 40 years, the Michigan Womyn's Music Festival held its last event in 2015. This final gathering followed the withdrawal of support by the National Center for Lesbian Rights, National LGBTQ Task Force, and The TransAdvocate nonprofit website, for a boycott against MichFest and its womyn-born womyn intention.

The RadFem Collective
The RadFem Collective, a UK-based radical feminist group, describes its membership as "restricted to 'women born women and living as women'" and promotes womyn-born womyn policies. The statement for the 2015 conference was rephrased in explanatory form to read "RadFems Resist is a women only, feminist event. Our conference is a space for women to share our experiences as women, to politically self organise for women's liberation and to celebrate womanhood in a safe environment. We welcome all women who were raised and socialized as girls to join us...We are gender abolitionists who have been raised and socialized as girls and women *because of our female bodies* in the context of patriarchy."

See also
 Feminist views on transgender topics
 Sex segregation
 Third-wave feminism
 Transphobia
 Women-only space
 Womyn's land

References

Works cited

Further reading

 
 
  (Sister Outrider received the 2016 Best Blog award from  Write to End Violence Against Women.)
 
 

Books and journals

External links

Egale Canada Backgrounder on Nixon v. Vancouver Rape Relief 
Press For Change briefing paper

Feminist terminology
Lesbian culture
Lesbian feminism
Lesbian history
Political lesbianism
Radical feminism
Sex segregation
Women-related neologisms
Feminism and transgender
Transphobia